is an onsen (hot spring) in the Hakkōda Mountains in the city of Aomori, Aomori Prefecture in Japan. It is known for its "Sen-nin-buro" or "1,000-person bath", a large mixed gender public bath.

Climate
Despite the extremely high snowfall, Sukayu Onsen is accessible by road all year round.

Sukayu Onsen, despite the incredibly high yearly snowfall, has a humid continental climate (Dfb), and is one of the coldest and snowiest inhabited places in Japan. Summers are generally short, but mild to warm with many rainy days. Winters are cold by Japanese standards and extremely snowy, due to the high elevation and the Aleutian Low pumping out loads of snow. Springs and Autumns can be highly variable, being rainy, snowy, cold, mild, or sunny, or all kinds of weather in a single week.

References

External links
  

Tourist attractions in Aomori Prefecture
Hot springs of Aomori Prefecture
Buildings and structures in Aomori Prefecture
Landforms of Aomori Prefecture
Aomori (city)